Back to Life is a British dark comedy-drama co-written by Laura Solon and Daisy Haggard and starring Haggard and Adeel Akhtar that premiered on BBC One on 15 April 2019. On 10 November 2019, the series premiered in the United States on Showtime. The first series received critical acclaim with many reviews highly praising the performance and writing of Haggard. On 19 November 2019, Back to Life was renewed for a second series; it premiered on 31 August 2021 to similar positive reviews. There are currently no plans for a third series, as Haggard announced that a story has not yet been developed, but it has not entirely been ruled out.

Plot
Miri Matteson has just returned home to Hythe, Kent, after serving an 18-year prison sentence. As Miri attempts to rebuild her life, she forms a friendship with Billy, who cares for the elderly woman next door.

Cast
Daisy Haggard as Miri Matteson
Geraldine James as Caroline Matteson, Miri's mother
Richard Durden as Oscar Matteson, Miri's father
Adeel Akhtar as Billy, Miri's budding love interest  
Jo Martin as Janice, Miri's parole officer
Jamie Michie as Dom, Miri's now married pre-prison boyfriend and Caroline's secret affair
Christine Bottomley as Mandy, Miri's now married pre-prison best friend
Juliet Cowan as Tina, local policewoman who was Miri’s childhood enemy
Imogen Gurney as Lara, Miri's former best friend
Liam Williams as Nathan, Miri's boss at the fish and chip shop (series 1)
Souad Adel Faress as Anna, Billy's wife (series 1)
Frank Feys as Samuel, a private investigator (series 1)
Ade Edmondson as John Boback, Lara’s father (series 2)
Lizzy McInnerny as Norah Boback, Lara’s mother (series 2)
Meera Syal as Gaia, Billy's mum (series 2)

Episodes

Series 1 (2019)

Series 2 (2021)

Production
Harry and Jack Williams are the executive producers of Back to Life with Sarah Hammond. They previously produced the BBC show Fleabag.

Various scenes for both series were filmed in Hythe and Lydd-on-Sea in Kent. Dungeness features in Series One and Folkestone Harbour Arm doubles as the Pier and Lighthouse in Series Two. The Abbot's Cliff sound mirror in Dover, on top of the White Cliffs of Dover, feature in both series.

Release
Back to Life was launched as a boxset on BBC iPlayer on 15 April 2019, and was shown weekly on BBC One from 15 April 2019.

Reception
The show has received critical acclaim. For the first series, review aggregator website Rotten Tomatoes reported a 100% approval rating with an average rating of 8.4/10, based on 26 critic reviews. The website's critics consensus reads, "Driven by the marvelous Daisy Haggard, Back to Life questions what it means to be a person with humor, heart, and a genuine sense of surprise." The first series was also compared positively to critically acclaimed tragicomedy Fleabag with which it shares producers. Metacritic, which uses a weighted average, assigned a score of 88 out of 100 based on 14 critics, indicating "universal acclaim".

For the second series, Rotten Tomatoes reported a 100% approval rating with an average rating of 8.8/10, based on 5 critic reviews. Metacritic assigned a score of 87 out of 100 based on 6 critics, indicating "universal acclaim".

Home media

References

External links

2010s British comedy-drama television series
2020s British comedy-drama television series
2019 British television series debuts
BBC Television shows
British comedy-drama television shows
English-language television shows
Television shows set in Kent
Television shows shot in Kent
Television series by All3Media